Francis "Bubba" Marriott (born December 25, 1938) is a former American football quarterback who played one season with the Montreal Alouettes of the Canadian Football League. He played college football at Troy State College. He was also a member of the New York Giants of the National Football League.

College career
Marriott played for the Troy Trojans from 1957 to 1960, earning All-American honors his senior year in 1960.

Professional career

New York Giants
Marriott was a member of the New York Giants practice squad from 1961 to 1962 after going undrafted in the 1960 NFL draft.

Montreal Alouettes
Marriott signed with the Montreal Alouettes to serve as the backup quarterback behind  on July 29, 1963. He recorded one touchdown and ten interceptions on 81 passing attempts during the 1963 season. He was released by the Alouettes on July 31, 1964.

Coaching career

Toronto Rifles
Marriott served as head coach and general manager of Toronto Rifles of the Continental Football League.

Bramalea Satellites
Marriott was later head coach of the Bramalea Satellites of the Northern Football Conference, earning coach of the year honors in 1973.

References

External links
Just Sports Stats

Living people
1938 births
Players of American football from Alabama
American football quarterbacks
Canadian football quarterbacks
American players of Canadian football
Troy Trojans football players
Montreal Alouettes players
People from Foley, Alabama